Jinzhong, formerly Yuci, is a prefecture-level city in east central Shanxi province of the People's Republic of China, bordering Hebei province to the east.
As of the 2020 census, its total population was 3,379,498 inhabitants whom 1,226,617 lived in the Yuci and Taigu urban districts. However,5,433,659 lived in the built-up (or metro) area of Taiyuan - Jinzhong made of Yuci district plus the 6 Taiyuan urban districts, largely conurbated.

History
Lingshi County was the location of the Nanshan Colliery disaster.

In 1999, the area was considered sufficiently urbanized that Jinzhong Prefecture became a prefecture-level city, with its former seat at Yuci becoming its county-level Yuci District.

Administrative divisions
Jinzhong is divided into the following county-level subdivisions:

Climate
Jinzhong has a continental, monsoon-influenced semi-arid climate (Köppen BSk), with cold and very dry winters, and hot, humid summers. Typifying the influence of the East Asian Monsoon, over two-thirds of the annual  of precipitation occurs from June to September.

Transportation
Taiyuan–Jiaozuo Railway

Culture 
The prefecture-level city houses several Shanxi Courtyard Houses, businessmen's residences lauded as outstanding civilian residences.

Yuci District is increasingly connected to nearby Taiyuan, whose built-up area was home to 3,848,151 people in 2010.

Sister Cities

 Jinhua, Zhejiang
  Szolnok, Hungary
  Quảng Nam Province, Vietnam
  Vals, Austria
  Provins, Île-de-France, France
  Luang Prabang, Laos

References

External links
 Jinzhong City Portal
 - Jinzhong Information Network 

 
Cities in Shanxi